Apiletria purulentella is a moth in the family Autostichidae. It was described by Henry Tibbats Stainton in 1867. It is found in Palestine, Armenia, Iran and Iraq.

The wingspan is about 30 mm for males and 28 mm for females. The forewings are of the males are smooth pale ochreous, without markings and the hindwings are dark grey. Females are wholly ochreous-whitish, except for a few brown scales on the second joint of the palpi anteriorly, and bronzy segmental bands of the abdomen.

References

Moths described in 1867
Apiletria